Deer Creek is a stream in eastern Clinton County in the U.S. state of Missouri. It is a tributary to Shoal Creek.

Deer Creek most likely was named for the deer along its course.

See also
List of rivers of Missouri

References

Rivers of Clinton County, Missouri
Rivers of Missouri